David Kinloch (1560–1617) was a Scottish physician and poet.

Kinloch was imprisoned by the Spanish Inquisition.

In Scotland, Kinloch was appointed a physician to the king on 21 March 1597. James VI signed a lengthy Latin testimonial referring to Kinloch's kinship to Ramsay and Lindsay of Edzell families.

Kinloch married Grizzel Hay, the heiress of the lands of Gourdie. He owned the estate of Aberbothrie in Alyth.

His portrait, dated 1614, is displayed at Ninewells Hospital, Dundee.

Kinloch published a medical treatise in Latin verse, De hominis procreatione, anatome, ac morbis internis (Paris, 1596).

References

1560 births
1617 deaths
Scottish obstetricians
Court of James VI and I
Court physicians
17th-century Scottish medical doctors
16th-century Scottish medical doctors
New Latin-language poets
Scottish poets